Bonata may refer to:

 Bonata septata, an extinct genus of Ediacaran organism
 49987 Bonata, a minor planet
 Diego Bonata, 2003 IDSA Galilleo Award winner and president of CieloBuio
 Serafino Bonata, Italian skyrunner who competed at the 2010 Skyrunning World Championships

See also 
 Bonita (disambiguation)
 Boneta, Utah